= Invaders from Space (video game) =

1980 video game

- Developer: Carl Miller
- Publisher: Acorn Software
- Platform: TRS-80
- Release: 1980
- Genre: Fixed shooter

Invaders from Space is a Space Invaders clone for the TRS-80 published in 1980 by Acorn Software.

== Contents ==
Invaders from Space is a game in which waves of alien invaders use bombs which the player must avoid, and then eliminate the aliens before they destroy the base station.

== Reception ==
Bruce Campbell reviewed Invaders from Space in The Space Gamer No. 45. Campbell commented that "This is one of the better invader games available. It is particularly recommended if players with widely divergent abilities will be playing."
